Mita Bungaku (三田文学) is a Japanese literary magazine established in 1910 at Keio University that published early works by young Japanese authors such as Yōjirō Ishizaka, Kyōka Izumi, Hakushū Kitahara, Jun'ichirō Tanizaki, Takitarō Minakami, Kojima Masajirō, Ryūnosuke Akutagawa, and Ayako Sono.

Mita Bungaku was established by student and author Mantarō Kubota and others with help from Kafū Nagai in 1910. The magazine is published monthly.

References

External links
  (in Japanese)

1910 establishments in Japan
Literary magazines published in Japan
Monthly magazines published in Japan
Keio University
Magazines established in 1910
Magazines published in Tokyo